This is a list of lighthouses in Cameroon.

Lighthouses

See also
List of lighthouses in Nigeria (to the west)
List of lighthouses in Equatorial Guinea (to the south)
Lists of lighthouses and lightvessels

References

External links

Cameroon

Lighthouses
Lighthouses